The 2001 season of the Tuvalu A-Division was the inaugural season of association football competition. FC Niutao won the championship.

References

Tuvalu A-Division seasons
Tuvalu
football